Volodymyr Mykhailovych Ivasyuk or Volodymyr Ivasiuk (4 March 1949 – 24–27 April 1979) was a  Ukrainian songwriter, composer and poet. He is the author and composer of the widely popular song "Chervona Ruta" popularized by Sofia Rotaru in 1971, and later covered by other singers.

Biography

Ivasyuk was born in Kitsman, Chernivtsi Oblast. His father Mykhailo Ivasyuk was a well-known writer from Bukovyna. His mother Sofiya Ivasyuk, from Zaporizhzhia Oblast, was a teacher in a local school. He had two sisters, Halyna (b. 1944) and Oksana (b. 1960). As early as the age of five, Volodymyr began learning to play the violin at a music school. Later, he learnt to play the piano as well. In 1964 he created an ensemble - "Bukovyna" - in his school and wrote their first songs, the first of which was "Lullaby".

After Volodymyr had already graduated from secondary school, his family moved to the city of Chernivtsi where his father was offered a teaching position at the Bukovynian State Medical University. Volodymyr went on to study at the Lviv Medical Institute while he continued his musical career. He joined the "Karpaty Ensemble" at a local community centre and played the violin and offered his songs to be performed.

He became an overnight national sensation in the Soviet Union, after a public performance on 13 September 1970 of his compositions "Chervona Ruta" (Ukrainian for 'Red Rue') and "Vodohray" with Olena Kuznetsova. In 1971 his "Chervona Ruta", performed live in Moscow with Vasyl Zinkevych and Nazariy Yaremchuk, and won the Best Song of the Year award of the Soviet Union. His composition "Vodohray" won the best song award the next year as well. "Chervona Ruta", sung by Sofia Rotaru, was featured in the musical-film Chervona Ruta.

Ivasyuk moved to Lviv to formally study composition at the Lviv Conservatory of Music. Upon graduation from the medical institute, he worked as a doctor, and joined the post-graduate courses at the Department of Pathological Physiology to work for his next degree. In Lviv Volodymyr created the songs: "I am your wing", "Two rings", "Ballad about mallow", "Ballad about two violins". All these songs and other works of Ivasyuk were premiered by Rotaru.

On 24 April 1979, after finishing a phone call, he was scheduled to meet someone at the Lviv conservatory. He never got there nor did he report for duty as a doctor. 3 days later, his parents and older sister reported him missing to the police. An investigation follows, until the Lviv district attorney put a temporary pause on the search.

On 18 May he was found hanged in a forest located on the outskirts of Lviv. The body was discovered by an off-duty soldier who was testing his radio. The official cause of death was listed as suicide but the exact circumstances remain unknown to this day. His celebrity status in the Soviet Union and his cultural contributions to Ukraine drew the attention of authorities. His songs, mostly about love to local geographical features and customs, could be perceived as rousing nationalist sentiments in listeners, but Ivasyuk was never confirmed to be politically active.

Ivasyuk’s funeral was attended by over 10,000 people. After his death his compositions were removed for a time from sale and radio play. In June 2019 a new official Forensic examination concluded that Ivasyuk could not have hanged himself without the help of someone else.

Ivasyuk is buried at Lychakiv Cemetery. Among his legacy was the first Soviet rock-opera, whose scenario and songs were specifically written for performance by Sofia Rotaru. In 2009, President Viktor Yushchenko awarded Ivasyuk the Hero of Ukraine medal posthumously.

Remembrance
There is a museum in Chernivtsi dedicated to preserving his memory and he has statues in Lviv and Kitsman.

In 2015 former Nohinska street in Dnipro was renamed to Volodymyr Ivasyuk street.

References

External links
 Pages to memories of Volodymyr Ivasyuk
 Volodymyr Ivasiuk’s biography published in “The Great Ukrainians” series
 'The owls did it’ – Taylor & Francis Online

1949 births
1979 deaths
Soviet composers
Soviet male composers
Ukrainian composers
Ukrainian male poets
Ukrainian songwriters
Ukrainian Soviet Socialist Republic people
Lviv Conservatory alumni
Recipients of the title of Hero of Ukraine
Recipients of the Shevchenko National Prize
Burials at Lychakiv Cemetery
20th-century Ukrainian poets
20th-century classical musicians
20th-century male writers
20th-century male musicians